Bart Jan-Baptist Marie Brentjens (born 10 October 1968 in Haelen) is a Dutch racing cyclist in mountain biking.

Brentjens won a gold medal for mountain biking in the 1996 Summer Olympics, the first to recognize cross-country mountain biking as an event. He followed this with bronze in the 2004 Summer Olympics. Previously he won gold at the 1995 UCI Mountain Bike & Trials World Championships. In 2007 he became 10th time Dutch National champion

Brentjens competed in Men's category of the Absa Cape Epic in 2005, winning 1st place overall with team mate Roel Paulissen. In 2009 he won 2nd place overall, this time competing alongside Chris Jongewaard. Brentjens then began competing in the Master's category. He won the category in both 2012 with Jan Weevers and in 2014 with Abraao Azevedo. He has completed the marathon stage race ten times to date.

Brentjens, along with Rob Warner, is also a co-commentator for Red Bull TV's official coverage of the UCI Mountain Bike World Cup (XCO).

Since November 2016 Bart Brentjens is Product Manager at American Eagle mountainbikes.

Major results

1996 Summer Olympics

Men's cross-country 

 Gold Medal (Cross Country 1996 Atlanta, USA)

UCI Mountain Bike & Trials World Championships
 Gold Medal (Cross Country: 1995)
 Silver Medal (Marathon: 2003,2005)
 Bronze Medal (Cross Country: 1994,2000; Marathon: 2004)

 UCI Mountain Bike World Cup
 1st Overall (1994)

 Absa Cape Epic
 1st Overall (2005)
 3rd Overall (2007)
 2nd Overall (2009)
 1st Masters category (2012)
 2nd Masters category (2013)
 1st Masters category (2014)
 1st Masters category (2015)

See also
 List of Dutch Olympic cyclists

References

External links
 

1968 births
Living people
Dutch male cyclists
Dutch mountain bikers
Cross-country mountain bikers
Marathon mountain bikers
Cyclists at the 1996 Summer Olympics
Cyclists at the 2000 Summer Olympics
Cyclists at the 2004 Summer Olympics
Cyclists at the 2008 Summer Olympics
Olympic cyclists of the Netherlands
Olympic gold medalists for the Netherlands
Olympic bronze medalists for the Netherlands
People from Leudal
Olympic medalists in cycling
Medalists at the 2004 Summer Olympics
UCI Mountain Bike World Champions (men)
Cyclists from Limburg (Netherlands)
Medalists at the 1996 Summer Olympics
Cape Epic winners